The 2000–01 IBLA Internationals season was the first season for the team. The team played in the one and only season of the International Baseball League of Australia's Development League, All games were held on the Gold Coast at Palm Meadows with some showcase games played at Carrara Oval.

The team was a composite team made up of players from countries such as Korea, Japan, South Africa, Guam, New Zealand, United States and Australia.

Regular season 
The regular season consisted of 43 games, All games were played at Palm Meadows with the exception of showcase games that were played at Carrara Oval.

The team was made up of players from around the world, with the majority of the team being made up of prospects from the LG Twins of the Korean Major league, Other players from the USA, New Zealand, South Africa, Japan and Australia.

Standings

Record vs opponents

Game log

Postseason
All games for the 2001 postseason were played at Palm Meadows on the Gold Coast. All finals were a 1 game play-off.

Finals Series
Winners of Game 1 and 2 went into Championship games, Losers of game 1 and 2 went into a playoff for 3rd.

Game 1 1st vs 4th: 19 January 2001

Game 4 Championship Game: 21 January 2001

Awards

Roster

References 

IBLA Internationals